Cyrtodactylus jambangan  is a species of gecko that is endemic to the Philippines.

References

Cyrtodactylus
Reptiles described in 2010